

See also
Uniform tiling
Convex uniform honeycombs
List of k-uniform tilings
List of convex uniform tilings
Uniform tilings in hyperbolic plane

Mathematics-related lists